María del Mar Feito Acebo (born September 10, 1975 in Madrid) is a former field hockey forward from Spain, who represented her native country at three consecutive Summer Olympics, starting in 1996 (Atlanta, Georgia). She played club hockey at a club named San Pablo Valdeluz.

References
 Spanish Olympic Committee

External links
 

1975 births
Living people
Spanish female field hockey players
Olympic field hockey players of Spain
Field hockey players at the 1996 Summer Olympics
Field hockey players at the 2000 Summer Olympics
Field hockey players at the 2004 Summer Olympics
Field hockey players from Madrid